Wanshan District is a district of the city of Tongren, Guizhou province, People's Republic of China, bordering Hunan province to the southeast and east. Wanshan was known as Wanshan Special District until November 2011, when it was renamed Wanshan District.

Postal Code: 554200.

Climate

References

External links
Official website of Wanshan Government

Geography of Guizhou